is a Japanese female mixed martial artist and kickboxer.

Background

Martial arts training
While attending the Takaoka University of Law, Nomura achieved third place in 1996 and second place in 1998 at the All Japan Student Judo Championships in the -56 kg and -57 kg categories, respectively.

At a Brazilian Jiu-Jitsu Asia Open held on September 11 and 12, 2010 at the Tokyo Budokan, Nomura won first place in the blue belt category.

Mixed martial arts career
She defeated Yuko Kagoshima by technical submission after the referee stopped the fight when Nomura caught Kagoshima with an armbar in the second round.

At Jewels 11th Ring on  during the semi-finals of the Lightweight Queen tournament, Nomura suffered her first professional defeat via unanimous decision at the hands of eventual tournament champion Ayaka Hamasaki.

Kickboxing career

Mixed martial arts record

|-
| Loss
| align=center| 3-1
| Ayaka Hamasaki
| Decision (0-3)
| Jewels 11th Ring
| 
| align=center| 2
| align=center| 5:00
| Bunkyo, Tokyo, Japan
| 
|-
| Win
| align=center| 3-0
| Saori Ishioka
| Decision (3-0)
| Jewels 9th Ring
| 
| align=center| 2
| align=center| 5:00
| Kabukicho, Tokyo, Japan
| 
|-
| Win
| align=center| 2-0
| Rina Tomita
| Decision (3-0)
| Deep: clubDeep Toyama: Barbarian Festival 8
| 
| align=center| 2
| align=center| 5:00
| Toyama, Toyama Prefecture, Japan
| 
|-
| Win
| align=center| 1-0
| Yuko Kagoshima
| Technical Submission (armbar)
| Jewels 7th ring
| 
| align=center| 2
| align=center| 4:35
| Kabukicho, Tokyo, Japan
|

Kickboxing record

Legend:

See also
List of female mixed martial artists
List of female kickboxers

References

External links
 Sakura Nomura Awakening Profile

Profile at Fightergirls.com
Official blog 

Japanese female mixed martial artists
Mixed martial artists utilizing kickboxing
Mixed martial artists utilizing judo
Mixed martial artists utilizing Brazilian jiu-jitsu
Japanese female kickboxers
Japanese practitioners of Brazilian jiu-jitsu
Female Brazilian jiu-jitsu practitioners
Japanese female judoka
1976 births
Living people
Sportspeople from Ishikawa Prefecture